An exotic star is a hypothetical compact star composed of exotic matter (something not made of electrons, protons, neutrons, or muons), and balanced against gravitational collapse by degeneracy pressure or other quantum properties. 

Types of exotic stars include
 quark stars (composed of quarks)
 strange stars (composed of strange quark matter, a condensate of up, down, and strange quarks)
 s (speculative material composed of preons, which are hypothetical particles and "building blocks" of quarks, should quarks be decomposable into component sub-particles).

Of the various types of exotic star proposed, the most well evidenced and understood is the quark star.

Objects dense enough to trap any emitted light, yet are not actually black holes, are called dark stars,
however the same name is used for hypothetical ancient "stars" which derived energy from dark matter.

Exotic stars are largely theoretical – partly because it is difficult to test in detail how such forms of matter may behave, and partly because prior to the fledgling technology of gravitational-wave astronomy, there was no satisfactory means of detecting cosmic objects that do not radiate electromagnetically or through known particles. It is not yet possible to verify novel cosmic objects of this nature by distinguishing them from known objects. Candidates for such objects are occasionally identified based on indirect evidence gained from observable properties.

Quark stars and strange stars

A quark star is a hypothesized object that results from the decomposition of neutrons into their constituent up and down quarks under gravitational pressure. It is expected to be smaller and denser than a neutron star, and may survive in this new state indefinitely, if no extra mass is added. Effectively, it is a single, very large hadron. Quark stars that contain strange matter are called strange stars.

The former appeared to be much smaller and the latter much colder than expected for a neutron star, suggesting that they were composed of material denser than neutronium. However, these observations were met with skepticism by researchers who said the results were not conclusive. After further analysis, RX J1856.5−3754 was excluded from the list of quark star candidates.

Electroweak stars

An electroweak star is a theoretical type of exotic star in which the gravitational collapse of the star is prevented by radiation pressure resulting from electroweak burning; that is, the energy released by the conversion of quarks into leptons through the electroweak force. This process occurs in a volume at the star's core approximately the size of an apple and containing about two Earth masses.

The stage of life of a star that produces an electroweak star is theorized to occur after a supernova collapse. Electroweak stars are denser than quark stars, and may form when gravitational attraction can no longer be withstood by quark degeneracy pressure, but can still be withstood by electroweak-burning radiation pressure.
This phase of a star's life may last upwards of 10 million years.

Preon stars

A preon star is a proposed type of compact star made of preons, a group of hypothetical subatomic particles. Preon stars would be expected to have huge densities, exceeding   kg/m³. They may have greater densities than quark stars, and they would be heavier but smaller than white dwarfs and neutron stars. Preon stars could originate from supernova explosions or the Big Bang. Such objects could be detected in principle through gravitational lensing of gamma rays. Preon stars are a potential candidate for dark matter. However, current observations from particle accelerators speak against the existence of preons, or at least do not prioritize their investigation, since the only particle detector presently able to explore very high energies (the Large Hadron Collider) is not designed specifically for this and its research program is directed towards other areas, such as studying the Higgs boson, quark–gluon plasma and evidence related to physics beyond the Standard Model.

Boson stars
A boson star is a hypothetical astronomical object formed out of particles called bosons (conventional stars are formed from mostly protons, which are fermions, but also consist of Helium-4 nuclei, which comprise bosons). For this type of star to exist, there must be a stable type of boson with self-repulsive interaction; one possible candidate particle
is the still-hypothetical "axion" (which is also a candidate for the not-yet-detected "non-baryonic dark matter" particles, which appear to compose roughly 25% of the mass of the Universe). It is theorized
that unlike normal stars (which emit radiation due to gravitational pressure and nuclear fusion), boson stars would be transparent and invisible.  The immense gravity of a compact boson star would bend light around the object, creating an empty region resembling the shadow of a black hole's event horizon. Like a black hole, a boson star would absorb ordinary matter from its surroundings, but because of the transparency, matter (which would probably heat up and emit radiation) would be visible at its center. Simulations suggest that rotating boson stars would be torus, or "doughnut-shaped", as centrifugal forces would give the bosonic matter that form.

, there is no significant evidence that such stars exist. However, it may become possible to detect them by the gravitational radiation emitted by a pair of co-orbiting boson stars, and GW190521, thought to be the most energetic black hole merging, may be the head-on collision of two boson stars.

Boson stars may have formed through gravitational collapse during the primordial stages of the Big Bang.
At least in theory, a supermassive boson star could exist at the core of a galaxy, which may explain many of the observed properties of active galactic cores.

Boson stars have also been proposed as candidate dark matter objects,
and it has been hypothesized that the dark matter haloes surrounding most galaxies might be viewed as enormous "boson stars."

The compact boson stars and boson shells are often studied involving fields like the massive (or massless) complex scalar fields, the U(1) gauge field and gravity with conical potential. The presence of a positive or negative cosmological constant in the theory facilitates a study of these objects in de Sitter and anti-de Sitter spaces.

Boson stars composed of elementary particles with spin-1 have been labelled Proca stars.

Braaten, Mohapatra, and Zhang (2016) have theorized that a new type dense axion star may exist in which gravity is balanced by the mean-field pressure of the axion Bose-Einstein condensate.
The possibility that dense axion stars exist has been challenged by other work that does not support this claim.

Planck stars

In loop quantum gravity, a Planck star is a theoretically possible astronomical object that is created when the energy density of a collapsing star reaches the Planck energy density. Under these conditions, assuming gravity and spacetime are quantized, there arises a repulsive "force" derived from Heisenberg's uncertainty principle. In other words, if gravity and spacetime are quantized, the accumulation of mass-energy inside the Planck star cannot collapse beyond this limit to form a gravitational singularity because it would violate the uncertainty principle for spacetime itself.

See also

 Dark star
 Exotic matter
 Glueball
 Q star
 Quasi-star

Footnotes

References

Sources

External links
 
 
 
 
 

Degenerate stars
Hypothetical stars
Compact stars